Jonna Valesca Tilgner (born November 18, 1984 in Hannover, Lower Saxony) is a German sprinter and hurdler, who specialized in the 400 metres. She won two medals, silver and bronze, in the women's 400 m hurdles at the 2007 Summer Universiade in Bangkok, Thailand, and at the 2009 Summer Universiade in Belgrade, Serbia, clocking at 56.27 and 56.02 seconds, respectively. Tilgner is also a member of Bremer Leichtathletik Team, and is coached and trained by Jens Ellrott.

Tilgner competed for the women's 4 × 400 m relay at the 2008 Summer Olympics in Beijing, along with her teammates Claudia Hoffmann, Florence Ekpo-Umoh, and Sorina Nwachukwu. Running the start-off leg, Tilgner recorded her individual-split time of 53.12 seconds, and the German team went on to an eighth-place finish in the final, for a total time of 3:28.45.

References

External links

NBC 2008 Olympics profile

German female sprinters
German female hurdlers
Living people
Olympic athletes of Germany
Athletes (track and field) at the 2008 Summer Olympics
Sportspeople from Hanover
Universiade medalists in athletics (track and field)
1984 births
Universiade silver medalists for Germany
Universiade bronze medalists for Germany
Medalists at the 2007 Summer Universiade
Medalists at the 2009 Summer Universiade